Win Win is a 2011 American sports comedy-drama film written and directed by Tom McCarthy and starring Paul Giamatti, Alex Shaffer, Amy Ryan, Bobby Cannavale, Jeffrey Tambor, Burt Young and Melanie Lynskey.

Plot
Small-town New Providence, New Jersey, attorney Mike Flaherty moonlights as a wrestling coach and struggles to keep his practice solvent, while shielding his wife Jackie and their two young girls, Abby and Stella, from the extent of the problem. When his court-appointed client, Leo Poplar, who is suffering from early dementia, turns out to have no locatable relatives, he persuades a judge to appoint him as guardian, for which he will receive a stipend of $1,508 per month. Mike, however, has no intention of taking care of Leo and moves him to a senior care facility while he continues to get paid for guardianship.

When Leo's teenage grandson, Kyle, shows up from Columbus, Ohio, looking to live with him, Mike and Jackie let him stay with them instead. Kyle tries to break into Leo's old house, and when Mike and Jackie question him about it, he reveals his troubled family life: His mom is in rehab, she lives with her boyfriend, and he doesn't want to go back. Upon hearing this, Jackie refuses to allow Kyle to return home and lets him stay in their household. After Kyle sits in on practice, they discover that he is a talented wrestler and enroll him at Mike's high school, where he can resume his education and wrestle on Mike's losing team, helping to make them viable contenders in their league.

This "everyone benefits" setup is disrupted when Kyle's mother Cindy shows up, fresh out of rehab. Cindy attempts to gain custody of her father and her son, and with them her father's substantial estate. However, Mike explains to Cindy and her lawyer that Leo had disinherited her from his will, causing her to become furious. Later, Cindy calls Kyle to her hotel room to show him court documents proving that Mike has been taking advantage of his arrangement with Leo. Kyle reacts violently towards his mother before running away.

Upon learning the truth about Mike, the boy rejects him as a money-seeking opportunist no better than his mother. Realizing the mistake of his earlier actions, and seeking instead to do what's best for both Leo and Kyle, Mike offers Cindy the monthly stipend in exchange for leaving them in his care. He and Jackie take Kyle into their home permanently and return Leo to his, with Mike instead taking a job as a bartender to address his financial problems.

Cast
 Paul Giamatti as Mike Flaherty
 Alex Shaffer as Kyle Timmons
 Amy Ryan as Jackie Flaherty
 Bobby Cannavale as Terry Delfino
 Jeffrey Tambor as Stephen Vigman
 Burt Young as Leo Poplar
 Melanie Lynskey as Cindy Timmons
 Margo Martindale as Eleanor Cohen
 David W. Thompson as Stemler
 Mike Diliello as Jimmy Reed
 Nina Arianda as Shelly
 Marcia Haufrecht as Gina Flaherty
 Sharon Wilkins as Judge Lee
 Clare Foley as Abby
 Tim Ransom as Stuart

Critical reception
Win Win received positive reviews from critics. On Rotten Tomatoes, the film has a rating of 94%, based on 166 reviews with an average rating of 7.8/10. The site's consensus states, "Rich, wonderful characters and strong performances populate Win Win, with writer/director Thomas McCarthy continuing to emerge as a great American humanist." On Metacritic, the film has a score of 75 out of 100, based on 34 critics, indicating "generally favorable reviews".

Peter Travers of Rolling Stone gave the film 3.5 stars out of 4, calling the film a "gem, hilarious and heartfelt with a tough core that repels all things sappy", and "just about perfect." Roger Ebert of the Chicago Sun-Times gave it 3 out of 4 stars, writing "You have a funny situation, and there's some truth in it and unexpected characters, well-acted, and you may not have a great film but you enjoy watching it." Steven Rea of The Philadelphia Inquirer gave it 3 out of 4 stars, writing "[Giamatti] delivers a marvel of a performance—all the more so because we forget that he is performing." He concluded "Win Win doesn't quite hit the high notes of grace and revelation that The Station Agent and The Visitor achieved, but McCarthy and his able cast pull off a similar mix of humor and pathos, smiles and angst." Ty Burr of The Boston Globe wrote "Win Win is the most radical movie yet from writer-director Tom McCarthy, and it may be one of the more daring movies to be recently released in America."

Soundtrack
Brooklyn-based indie rock band The National contributed an original song to the movie's soundtrack.  The song is titled "Think You Can Wait" and features vocals from fellow Brooklyn musician Sharon Van Etten.

References

External links
 
 
 
 

2011 films
2010s coming-of-age comedy-drama films
2011 independent films
2010s sports comedy-drama films
American coming-of-age comedy-drama films
American independent films
American sports comedy-drama films
Dune Entertainment films
Films about lawyers
Films directed by Tom McCarthy
Films set in New Jersey
Films shot in New Jersey
Films shot in New York (state)
Fox Searchlight Pictures films
Sport wrestling films
Union County, New Jersey
Films scored by Lyle Workman
2010s English-language films
2010s American films